Jeremy Pinnell is an American country artist from Elsmere, Kentucky.

Career
Pinnell released his first full-length album in 2014 titled OH/KY on SofaBurn Records. Pinnell released his second full-length album in 2017 titled Ties of Blood and Affection.
He released the single Joey on January 15, 2021.  This cover of the Concrete Blonde classic written by Johnette Napolitano is a stand alone single leading up to his 3rd full-length release, Goodbye L.A. which will be released on SofaBurn Records on October 1, 2021.

Discography
Studio albums
OH/KY (2014, SofaBurn)
Ties of Blood and Affection (2017, SofaBurn)
Goodbye L.A. (To be released October 1 2021, SofaBurn)
Singles
I Don't Believe (Live from Candyland) (2019, SofaBurn)
Joey (2021, SofaBurn)
Wanna Do Something (2021, SofaBurn)
Night Time Eagle (2021, SofaBurn)
Big Ol' Good (2021, SofaBurn)

References

External links
 Jeremy Pinnell on CincyMusic

Living people
Country musicians from Kentucky
People from Kenton County, Kentucky
Year of birth missing (living people)